The 2002 Maine Black Bears football team represented the University of Maine during the 2002 NCAA Division I-AA football season. It was the program's 111th season and they finished in a tie as Atlantic 10 Conference (A-10) co-champions with Northeastern. The Black Bears earned a berth into the 16-team Division I-AA playoffs, but lost in the quarterfinals to Georgia Southern, 7–31. Maine was led by 10th-year head coach Jack Cosgrove.

Schedule

Awards and honors
All-America – Stephen Cooper (Associated Press)
First Team All-Atlantic 10 – Stephen Cooper, David Cusano, Dennis Dottin-Carter
Second Team All-Atlantic 10 – Brendan Curry, Matt Hammond, Peter Richardson, Marcus Williams
Third Team All-Atlantic 10 – Jake Eaton
Atlantic 10 Defensive Player of the Year – Stephen Cooper

References

Maine
Maine Black Bears football seasons
Atlantic 10 Conference football champion seasons
Maine Black Bears football